Ortoncourt is a commune in the Vosges department in Grand Est in northeastern France.

History
There is a record of a latinate version of the name, Ortonis curte, recorded in the eleventh century when the village was part of the bailiwick of Châtel-sur-Moselle.   In terms of ecclesiastical administration its church, dedicated to Saint Urban, came under the parish of Moyemont.

Under the secular arrangements established in the wake of the French revolution, Ortoncourt in 1790 became part of the canton of Fauconcourt in the district of Rambervillers until 1800 when the modern administrative structure was introduced.

See also
Communes of the Vosges department

References

Communes of Vosges (department)